is an annual Japanese literary award. It is awarded based on votes by bookstore clerks from all over Japan.

Winners

Excellent translations

See also 
 CD Shop Awards

References

External links 
  
 J'Lit | Awards : Booksellers Award | Books from Japan 

Awards established in 2004
2004 establishments in Japan
Japanese literary awards